Huberodendron is a genus of flowering plants in the family Malvaceae.
It contains the following species:
 Huberodendron allenii
 Huberodendron ingens
 Huberodendron patinoi
 Huberodendron swietenioides

References 

Bombacoideae
Malvaceae genera
Taxonomy articles created by Polbot
Taxa named by Adolpho Ducke